Derek Wilkinson (4 June 1935 – 13 September 2017) was an English footballer who played as a winger, and spent his entire senior career with Sheffield Wednesday. Wilkinson made 231 appearances for the Owls from 1954 to 1965 before being forced to retire due to injury. Wilkinson died at age 82 after a prolonged illness.

References

1935 births
2017 deaths
Sheffield Wednesday F.C. players
English Football League players
Association football forwards
English footballers
People from Stalybridge